The Beijing International Triathlon is a world-class, Olympic distance triathlon in the Fengtai District of Beijing.

The race features a 1.5 km swim in the picturesque Qing Long Lake, a challenging 40 km bike race from the Park to Qian Ling Mountain and back, and finally a fast 10 km run through the beautiful trails and pathways of Qing Long Lake Park.

The Beijing International Triathlon is the newest international event to be added to the Escape TO Alcatraz Triathlon Series. The top 50 finishers across all divisions will qualify for an entry into the next year's Escape from Alcatraz Triathlon in San Francisco, CA.



2013

Date: September 21, 2013

Location: Qinglong Lake Park, Fengtai District, Beijing, China



2012

Date: September 16, 2012

Results:

Pro Male:

Bevan Docherty, NZL, 1:54:24

Matt Reed, USA,1:55:04

Chris “Macca” McCormack, AUS, 1:56:37

Brian Fleishmann, USA, 1:58: 37

Bai Faquan, CHN, 2:03:03

Pro Female:

Sarah Groff, USA, 2:04:09

Nicky Samuels, NZL, 2:05:52

Becky Lavelle, USA, 2:06:40

Jenna Parker, USA, 2:06:47

Ricarda Lisk, GER, 2:14:32

Zhang Yi, CHN, 2:18:07

References

External links
 www.beijinginternationaltriathlon.com

Triathlon competitions in China
Sport in Beijing